Ahinga Bienvenu Selemani (born March 15, 1996) is a professional soccer player who plays for One Knoxville SC in USL League One. Born in Canada, he represented the United States at youth international level.

Club career

Early career
Before attending college, Selemani played for Crew Soccer Academy Wolves from 2011 to 2014.

In 2014, Selemani began attending the University of Michigan, where he scored three goals in eighteen appearances in his first year and was named to the Big Ten All-Freshman Team. That summer, he played in the PDL with local club AFC Ann Arbor, before switching to UC Santa Barbara in the fall. That year, he scored five goals in 23 appearances. That summer, he made one appearance in the PDL for Ventura County Fusion. In 2016, Selemani scored seven goals in twenty appearances for the Gauchos.

Panetolikos
In April 2017, Selemani signed his first professional contract with Superleague Greece side Panetolikos.

Vlašim
In 2018, Selemani signed with Czech National Football League side Vlašim and scored two goals in fifteen appearances that season.

Hawke's Bay United
On October 30, 2019, Selemani signed with New Zealand Football Championship side Hawke's Bay United. He went on to score 10 goals and add 6 assists in 16 matches while finishing as a runner-up in the league MVP race. He also won Hawke's Bay United Player's choice player of the year, Coach's choice player of the year & took home the golden boot. He left the club in summer 2020 to join Gibraltar National League team Lincoln Red Imps.

Cavalry FC
On December 10, 2020, Selemani signed with Canadian Premier League side Cavalry FC. After the 2021 season, Cavalry announced that Selemani would leave the club after one season

Gudja United
In January 2022, he signed a short-term deal with Gudja United in the Maltese Premier League.

One Knoxville SC
On 27 December 2022, One Knoxville SC signed Selemani ahead of the 2023 season.

International career
Selemani represented the United States at the 2013 CONCACAF U-17 Championship, making three appearances and scoring a goal against Haiti.

Career statistics

References

External links

1996 births
Living people
Association football forwards
American soccer players
Canadian soccer players
Soccer players from Michigan
Soccer people from New Brunswick
Sportspeople from Ann Arbor, Michigan
Sportspeople from Moncton
American expatriate soccer players
Canadian expatriate soccer players
Expatriate footballers in Greece
American expatriate sportspeople in Greece
Canadian expatriate sportspeople in Greece
Expatriate footballers in the Czech Republic
American expatriate sportspeople in the Czech Republic
Canadian expatriate sportspeople in the Czech Republic
Expatriate association footballers in New Zealand
American expatriate sportspeople in New Zealand
Canadian expatriate sportspeople in New Zealand
Expatriate footballers in Gibraltar
American expatriate sportspeople in Gibraltar
Canadian expatriate sportspeople in Gibraltar
Expatriate footballers in Malta
American expatriate sportspeople in Malta
Canadian expatriate sportspeople in Malta
Michigan Wolverines men's soccer players
AFC Ann Arbor players
UC Santa Barbara Gauchos men's soccer players
Ventura County Fusion players
Panetolikos F.C. players
FC Sellier & Bellot Vlašim players
Hawke's Bay United FC players
Lincoln Red Imps F.C. players
Cavalry FC players
Gudja United F.C. players
USL League Two players
Czech National Football League players
New Zealand Football Championship players
Canadian Premier League players
Maltese Premier League players
United States men's youth international soccer players
One Knoxville SC players